The Architectural Work of Le Corbusier, an Outstanding Contribution to the Modern Movement is a World Heritage Site consisting of a selection of 17 building projects in several countries by the Franco-Swiss architect Le Corbusier. These sites demonstrate how Modern Movement architecture was applied to respond to the needs of society and show the global range of a style and an architect.

List of the sites

Location maps

References

External links
The Architectural Work of Le Corbusier, an Outstanding Contribution to the Modern Movement / UNESCO Official Website
Association des sites Le Corbusier
 The Architectural Work of Le Corbusier: An Outstanding Contribution to the Modern Movement at Fondation Le Corbusier website

World Heritage Sites in Argentina
World Heritage Sites in Belgium
World Heritage Sites in France
World Heritage Sites in Germany
World Heritage Sites in India
World Heritage Sites in Japan
World Heritage Sites in Switzerland
Modernist architecture